Air Canada is the flag carrier and the largest airline of Canada by size and passengers carried. Air Canada maintains its headquarters in the borough of Saint-Laurent, Montreal, Quebec. The airline, founded in 1937, provides scheduled and charter air transport for passengers and cargo to 222 destinations worldwide. It is a founding member of the Star Alliance. Air Canada's major hubs are at Toronto Pearson International Airport (YYZ), Vancouver International Airport (YVR), and Montréal–Trudeau International Airport (YUL). The airline's regional service is Air Canada Express.

Canada's national airline originated from the Canadian federal government's 1936 creation of Trans-Canada Air Lines (TCA), which began operating its first transcontinental flight routes in 1938. In 1965, TCA was renamed Air Canada following government approval. After the deregulation of the Canadian airline market in the 1980s, the airline was privatized in 1988. On 4 January 2000, Air Canada took over its largest rival, Canadian Airlines. In 2003, the airline filed for bankruptcy protection and in the following year emerged and reorganized under the holding company ACE Aviation Holdings Inc. In 2017, Air Canada flew 48 million passengers, as the airline celebrated its 80th anniversary. In October 2021, the Government of Canada acquired 6.4% of Air Canada, and has not ruled out further investment.

Air Canada has a fleet of Airbus A330, Boeing 777, and Boeing 787 Dreamliner wide-body aircraft on long-haul routes and uses the Airbus A320 family aircraft (including the A320 and A321 variants), Boeing 737 MAX 8, and Airbus A220-300 aircraft on short-haul routes. The carrier's operating divisions include Air Canada Cargo, Air Canada Express, Air Canada Jetz (private jet charters), and Air Canada Rouge (leisure airline). Its subsidiary, Air Canada Vacations, provides vacation packages to over 90 destinations. Together with its regional partners, the airline operates on average more than 1,613 scheduled flights daily.

History

Trans-Canada Air Lines (1937–1965)

The predecessor of Air Canada, Trans-Canada Air Lines (TCA), was created by federal legislation as a subsidiary of Canadian National Railway (CNR) on 11 April 1937. The newly created Department of Transport under Minister C. D. Howe desired an airline under government control to link cities on the Atlantic coast to those on the Pacific coast. Using $5 million in Crown seed money, two Lockheed Model 10 Electras and one Boeing Stearman biplane were purchased from Canadian Airways and experienced airline executives from United Airlines and American Airlines were brought in.

Passenger flights began on 1 September 1937, with an Electra carrying two passengers and mail from Vancouver to Seattle, a $14.20 round trip, and, on 1 July 1938, TCA hired its first flight attendants. Transcontinental routes from Montreal to Vancouver began on 1 April 1939, using 12 Lockheed Model 14 Super Electras and six Lockheed Model 18 Lodestars. By January 1940, the airline had grown to about 579 employees.

Canadian Pacific Airlines (CP Air) suggested in 1942 a merger with TCA. Prime Minister William Lyon Mackenzie King rejected the proposal and introduced legislation regulating TCA as the only airline in Canada allowed to provide transcontinental flights. With the increase in air travel after World War II, CP Air was granted one coast-to-coast flight and a few international routes.

Originally headquartered in Winnipeg, which was also the site of the national maintenance base, the federal government moved TCA's headquarters to Montreal in 1949; the maintenance base later also moved east. With the development of the ReserVec in 1953, TCA became the first airline in the world to use a computer reservation system with remote terminals.

Renamed to Air Canada and early years (1965–1990)

By 1964, TCA had grown to become Canada's national airline and, in 1964, Jean Chrétien submitted a private member's bill to change the name of the airline from Trans-Canada Airlines to Air Canada, which TCA had long used as its French-language name. This bill failed but it was later resubmitted and passed, with the name change taking effect on 1 January 1965. Elizabeth II, the Queen of Canada, flew on the first aircraft to bear the name and livery of Air Canada when she departed for the United Kingdom at the end of her 1964 tour of Prince Edward Island, Quebec and Ontario.

During the 1970s government regulations ensured Air Canada's dominance over domestic regional carriers and rival CP Air. Short-haul carriers were each restricted to one of five regions, and could not compete directly with Air Canada and CP Air. CP Air was subject to capacity limits on intercontinental flights, and restricted from domestic operations. Air Canada's fares were also subject to regulation by the government.

In 1976, with reorganization at CNR, Air Canada became an independent Crown corporation. The Air Canada Act of 1978 ensured that the carrier would compete on a more equal footing with rival regional airlines and CP Air, and ended the government's direct regulatory control over Air Canada's routings, fares, and services. The act also transferred ownership from Canadian National Railway to a subsidiary of the national government. Deregulation of the Canadian airline market, under the new National Transportation Act, 1987 officially opened the airline market in Canada to equal competition. The carrier's fleet expansion saw the acquisition of Boeing 727, Boeing 747, and Lockheed Tristar jetliners. In 1978 Judy Cameron became the first female pilot hired to fly for any major Canadian carrier when she was hired to fly by Air Canada.

With new fleet expenditures outpacing earnings, Air Canada officials indicated that the carrier would need additional sources of capital to fund its modernization. By 1985 the Canadian government was indicating a willingness to privatize both Canadian National Railways and Air Canada. In 1988 Air Canada was privatized, and 43% of shares were sold on the public market, with the initial public offering completed in October of that year. By this time, long-haul rival CP Air had become Canadian Airlines International following its acquisition by Pacific Western Airlines.

On 7 December 1987, Air Canada became the first airline in the world with a fleet-wide non-smoking policy, and in 1989 became completely privatized. The successful privatization program was led by the President and CEO, Pierre J Jeanniot. The associated extensive communication activities were aided by the Non-Executive Chairman, Claude I. Taylor.

Strategic changes (1990s)

In the early 1990s, Air Canada encountered financial difficulties as the airline industry slumped in the aftermath of the Persian Gulf War. In response, the airline restructured management by hiring former Delta Air Lines executive Hollis L. Harris as its CEO. Harris restructured the airline's operations, reduced management positions, moved the corporate headquarters to Dorval Airport, and sold the enRoute card business to Diners Club in 1992. By 1994, Air Canada had returned to profitability. The same year also saw the carrier winning route access to fly from Canada to the new Kansai Airport in Osaka, Japan.

In 1995, taking advantage of a new US-Canada open skies agreement, Air Canada added 30 new trans-border routes. In May 1997, Air Canada became a founding member of the Star Alliance, with the airline launching codeshares with several of the alliance's members. The second half of the 1990s saw the airline earn consistent profits, totalling $1 billion for the 1997 to 1999 period.

On 2 September 1998, pilots for Air Canada launched the company's first pilots' strike, demanding higher wages. At the end of 1999, the Canadian government relaxed some of the aviation regulations, aimed at creating a consolidation of the Canadian airline industry. That year, American Airlines in conjunction with Canadian financial company Onex Corp, launched takeover bids for ailing rival Canadian Airlines and Air Canada, spurring Air Canada to submit a competing offer for its largest rival.

Merger and reorganization (2000s)

In January 2001, Air Canada acquired Canada's second-largest air carrier, Canadian Airlines International, merging the latter's operations, becoming the world's twelfth-largest airline in the first decade of the 21st century. As Air Canada gained access to its former rival's financial statements, officials learned that the carrier was in worse financial shape than was previously believed. An expedited merger strategy was pursued, but in summer 2000 integration efforts led to flight delays, luggage problems and other frustrations. However, service improved following Air Canada officials' pledge to do so by January 2001. The airline was confronted by the global aviation market downturn and increased competition, posting back-to-back losses in 2001 and 2002.

Bankruptcy and restructuring
As Air Canada had employed a scorched earth policy to prevent the Onex proposed acquisition as one of its lines of defense, it had burdened itself with onerous contracts with almost all of its suppliers. As a result, on 1 April 2003, Air Canada filed for protection under the Companies' Creditors Arrangement Act; it emerged from this protection on 30 September 2004, 18 months later. During the period of bankruptcy protection, the company was subject to two competing bids from Cerberus Capital Management and Victor Li. The Cerberus bid would have seen former Prime Minister Brian Mulroney installed as chairman, being recruited by Cerberus' international advisory board chair Dan Quayle, the former vice-president of the United States. Cerberus was rejected because it had a reputation of changing existing employee pension agreements, a move strongly opposed by the CAW. At first, Air Canada selected Victor Li's Trinity Time Investments, which initially asked for a board veto and the chairmanship in return for investing $650 million in the airline. Li, who holds dual citizenship from Canada and Hong Kong, later demanded changes to the pension plan (which was not in his original takeover bid), but since the unions refused to budge, the bid was withdrawn.

Finally, Deutsche Bank unveiled an $850 million financing package for Air Canada, if it would cut $200 million in annual costs in addition to the $1.1 billion that the unions agreed on in 2003. It was accepted after last-minute talks between CEO Robert Milton and CAW president Buzz Hargrove got the union concessions needed to let the bid go through.

ACE Aviation Holdings became the new parent company under which the reorganized Air Canada was held. However, in November 2012 ACE sold all shares and warrants it held in Air Canada.

In October 2004, Canadian singer Celine Dion became the face of Air Canada, hoping to relaunch the airline and draw in a more international market after 18 months of bankruptcy protection. She recorded her single, You and I, which subsequently appeared in several Air Canada commercials.

Fleet modernization

On 31 October 2004, the last Air Canada Boeing 747 flight landed in Toronto from Frankfurt as AC873, ending 33 years of 747 service with the airline. The Boeing 747-400 fleet was replaced by the Airbus A340 fleet. On 19 October 2004, Air Canada unveiled a new aircraft colour scheme and uniforms. A Boeing 767-300ER was painted in the new silver-blue colour, and the dark green/almost black tail was replaced with a new version of the maple leaf known as the 'Frosted Leaf'.

On 9 November 2005, Air Canada agreed to renew its widebody fleet by purchasing 16 Boeing 777s (10 -300ERs, 6 -200LRs), and 14 Boeing 787-8s. It placed options on 18 Boeing 777s and 46 Boeing 787-8s and -9s. Deliveries of the 777s began in March 2007 and deliveries of the 787s began in May 2014.

On 24 April 2007, Air Canada exercised half of its options for the Boeing 787 Dreamliner. The firm order for the Dreamliners then stood at 37 plus 23 options, for a total of 60. The airline also cancelled orders for two Boeing 777Fs. In November 2007, Air Canada leased an additional Boeing 777-300ER.

Project XM
Started in July 2006 and since completed, Project XM: Extreme Makeover, was a $300 million aircraft interior replacement project to install new cabins on all aircraft. New aircraft such as the Boeing 777 were delivered with the new cabins factory installed.

New cabin features included:
 In Executive First, new horizontal fully flat Executive First Suites (on Boeing 767s, Boeing 777s, and Airbus A330s).
 New cabins in all classes on all aircraft, with new entertainment options.
 Personal AVOD ( touchscreen LCD) in Economy class (domestic and international) and Executive Class (domestic).
 Larger AVOD ( touchscreen LCD) equipped with noise-cancelling Sennheiser headphones available in Executive First Suites.
 Interactive games at all seats in Executive and Economy; XM Radio Canada available at every seat.
 USB ports to recharge electronic devices and for game controllers at all seats; 120 VAC plugs in most seats; In Economy (2 per triple) (1 per double) (3 per quad). In First Class/Executive (All seats)

Late 2000s financial difficulties
High fuel prices and the Great Recession caused Air Canada significant financial difficulties in the late 2000s. In June 2008, the airline announced it would lay off over 2,000 employees and cut its capacity by 7 percent by the first quarter of 2009. President and CEO Montie Brewer expressed confidence that the airline would weather the economic downturn.

Brewer resigned on 30 March 2009 and was replaced by Calin Rovinescu on 1 April. Rovinescu became the first Canadian President since Claude Taylor in 1992. Rovinescu, reported to be "an enforcer", was Air Canada's chief restructuring officer during its 2003 bankruptcy; he resigned that year after unions rejected his demands.

Federal finance minister Jim Flaherty appointed retired judge James Farley, who had presided over Air Canada's 2003 bankruptcy, to mediate pension issues between the company, the unions representing its employees, and retirees. The contracts with four of the unions also expired around this time. The airline stated that its $2.85 billion pension shortfall (which grew from $1.2 billion in 2007) was a "liquidity risk" in its first-quarter report, and it required new financing and pension "relief" to conserve cash for 2010 operations. The company was obligated to pay $650 million into the pension fund but it suffered a 2009 Q1 loss of $400 million, so it requested a moratorium on its pension payments in 2009. The unions had insisted on financial guarantees before agreeing on a deal.

In July 2009, Air Canada requested and received CA$1 billion in financial aid from a consortium of entities, including the Canadian government, ACE, and associate company Aeroplan. The Centre for Aviation reported that only CA$600 million was actually loaned to Air Canada; the rest of the money was from sale-leaseback accounting and "aggregating an array of biscuit-tin savings".

2010s
In December 2010, ACE sold 44 million Air Canada shares, followed by the remaining 31 million shares in November 2012 to Cormark Securities Inc.

In November 2014, Air Canada pilots voted by a majority of 84% in favour of a 10-year contract that allows the country's biggest passenger carrier to use arbitration or mediation to resolve disputes. A year later, the flight attendants also approved a 10-year agreement, apparently by a narrow (unstated) margin, with wage increases, increased job security and improvements to working conditions, according to Michel Cournoyer, the head of CUPE's Air Canada unit.

New branding and fleet 

On 9 February 2017, a new retro red and black aircraft livery was launched, to coincide with Air Canada's 80th anniversary and Canada's 150th anniversary of Confederation. The update includes design aspects from the logo used between 1964 and 1992, with an overall white colour scheme, with a black underside, tail fin with red maple leaf rondelle, black "Air Canada" lettering with a red maple leaf rondelle underneath, and a black "mask" surrounding the cockpit windows. 

In December 2013, Air Canada ordered 61 Boeing 737 MAX single-aisle narrow body aircraft to replace its existing fleet of Airbus A320 series aircraft with the first MAX 8 variant delivered on 2 November 2017. Some Airbus Airbus A319s will be transferred to Air Canada's Rouge subsidiary, with the remaining fleet retired. As part of the deal, Boeing purchased 25 Embraer E190s from Air Canada that were retired in 2016. The same year, Air Canada signed an agreement with Bombardier Aerospace to replace the E190s with Airbus A220/CSeries aircraft from 2019.

In July 2017, Air Canada reintroduced Premium Economy on its North American wide-body flights.

In April 2018, Air Canada rebranded its international business class cabin as Air Canada Signature Class. Passengers could expect an enhanced menu, including the new Air Canada Signature Cocktail, in addition new amenity kits, a chauffeur service (using BMW vehicles) at its hubs during domestic to international connections, and access to the Air Canada Signature Suite at Toronto Pearson International Airport. On select North American routes, Air Canada Signature Service is offered on widebody aircraft.

In May 2018, Air Canada listed Taiwan as part of China to comply with a requirement of China's civil aviation administration. On 6 June 2018, Air Canada and Air China signed a joint venture, the first joint venture between a North American and Chinese airline.

Proposed acquisition of Transat A.T.
On 16 May 2019, Air Canada announced it is in exclusive talks to buy Transat A.T., the parent company that owns Air Transat, for 520 million Canadian dollars. On 27 June 2019, Transat A.T. agreed to be purchased by Air Canada for CA$13 per share. The deal is still subject to shareholder and regulatory approval. On 11 August 2019, Air Canada raised the purchase price of Transat A.T. to CA$18 per share. The overall value of the deal was now 720 million dollars. On 23 August 2019, 95% of Transat A.T. shareholders approved the acquisition by Air Canada on that basis. The plan was "expected to face intense scrutiny from the Competition Bureau and other regulatory authorities, including in Europe", according to CBC News. The agreement was revised downwards in October 2020 to CA$5 per share, reflecting the challenges posed to the airline industry by the COVID-19 pandemic. The deal was dropped in April 2021 following a failure to secure European Commission approval.

2020s

COVID-19 pandemic 
Travel restrictions caused by the COVID-19 pandemic forced Air Canada to heavily restrict service. On 18 March 2020, the airline announced it would suspend most of its flights by 31 March. Service began to return to normal on 22 May, with flights to more cities being added over the summer. In its first quarterly financial report, Air Canada announced it had lost CA$1.05 billion, compared to a profit of CA$345 million in Q1 2019. The airline similarly suffered in the third quarter, reporting a loss of CA$685 million. It stated capacity in the fourth quarter of the 2020 fiscal year would be 75 percent lower than the previous year. In June 2022, after the provincial governments across the country began lifting pandemic-era restrictions, Air Canada announced it was cancelling over 150 daily flights in the summer due to unprecedented and unexpected pressure in the aviation industry.

In April 2021, the Government of Canada acquired 6.4% of Air Canada as a part of a $5.9 billion COVID-19 related assistance package, and has not ruled out further investment.

Corporate affairs

Ownership
Air Canada became fully privatized in 1989, and its variable voting shares are traded on the Toronto Stock Exchange (TSX:AC), and, since 29 July 2016, on OTCQX International Premier in the US under the single ticker symbol "ACDVF". As of April 2021, the Government of Canada owns approximately 6.4% of Air Canada.

Currently, the Air Canada Public Participation Act (ACPPA) limits ownership of Air Canada's voting interests by non-residents of Canada to a maximum of 25%. The Canada Transportation Act (CTA) also requires that Canadians own and control at least 75% of the voting interests of licensed Canadian carriers. Accordingly, Air Canada's articles contain restrictions to ensure that it remains "Canadian" as defined under the CTA.

Executives
Prior to 1976, Air Canada was a department of the Canadian National Railway (CNR), helmed by a department head who reported to the President of CNR. Since 1976, the following have been CEO and President:

 1976–1984: Claude Taylor (accountant; former Air Canada reservation agent and executive)
 1984–1990: Pierre Jeanniot (former Overhaul Research Technician and Air Canada executive)
 1990–1992: Claude Taylor
 1992–1996: Hollis L. Harris (World Airways CEO 2001–04, Continental CEO and President, 1990–92, President of Delta)
 1996–1999: R. Lamar Durrett (former executive with Delta, Continental and System One)
 1999–2004: Robert Milton (founding partner of Air Eagle Holdings Incorporated)
 2004–2009: Montie Brewer (former United Airlines executive)
 2009–February 2021: Calin Rovinescu
 February 2021–present: Michael Rousseau

Business trends
Air Canada had been loss-making for several years, but was profitable from 2012; however, due to the impact of the COVID-19 pandemic, the company was again loss-making in 2020 due to the pandemic. The key trends for the Air Canada group, including Air Canada Express and Air Canada rouge, are (years ending 31 December):

Headquarters

By federal law (Air Canada Public Participation Act), Air Canada has been obligated to keep its head office in Montreal. Its corporate headquarters is Air Canada Centre (French: Centre Air Canada), also known as La Rondelle ("The Puck" in French), a 7-storey building located on the grounds of Montréal–Trudeau International Airport in Saint-Laurent.

In 1975, Air Canada was headquartered at 1 Place Ville-Marie in Montreal.
In 1990, the airline moved its headquarters to the airport to cut costs.

Subsidiaries

Air Canada Cargo
Air Canada Cargo is the company's freight carrying division based at Toronto-Pearson, offering more than 150 shipping destinations through the Air Canada airline network, ground logistics and airline partners. Its route network has focused on European destinations through Eastern Canada departure points, along with direct services from Vancouver and Calgary to Frankfurt, London, Paris, and Zurich.

In Toronto, a new cargo terminal was completed in early 2002 which featured modernised inventory and conveyor systems. Cargo terminals are also found in Vancouver and Montreal.

Air Canada Express

Air Canada Express is the brand name of Air Canada's regional feeder service operated by independent carrier Jazz Aviation.

Air Canada Jetz

Launched in 2002, Air Canada Jetz is a charter service targeting sports teams, professional entertainers, and corporations. The Air Canada Jetz fleet consists of three Airbus A319s in an all business class configuration. In February 2014, Air Canada decided to leave the sports charter business. However, on 17 March 2015, Air Canada announced an agreement with several NHL teams to provide charter services under the Air Canada Jetz brand for six years starting from the 2015–2016 NHL season.

Air Canada Rouge

Launched in December 2012, Air Canada Rouge is a low-cost subsidiary of Air Canada. Air Canada Rouge serves predominantly leisure destinations in Europe, the Caribbean, South America, Central America, Mexico and the United States using Airbus A319, Airbus A320, and Airbus A321.

Air Canada Vacations
Air Canada Vacations is Air Canada's tour operator. All packages include accommodation, Aeroplan Miles and roundtrip airfare aboard Air Canada and/or its Star Alliance partners.

Air Canada Vacations offers Executive Class service on select flights, nonstop flights from major Canadian cities and daily flights to many destinations.

Aeroplan

Aeroplan is Air Canada's loyalty marketing program operated by Groupe Aeroplan Inc., which was spun off from Air Canada in 2005. However, as of 26 November 2018, Air Canada has signed a definitive agreement to re-purchase Aeroplan from Aimia Inc. Air Canada completed the purchase in January 2019.

Former subsidiaries

Air Canada Jazz

In 2001, Air Canada consolidated its wholly owned regional carriers Air BC, Air Nova, Air Ontario, and Canadian Regional Airlines into Air Canada Regional Incorporated. Several of these air carriers had previously operated as an "Air Canada Connector". In 2002, the consolidation was completed with the creation of a new brand, Air Canada Jazz. Air Canada Jazz was spun off in November 2006. ACE Aviation Holdings is no longer a shareholder of Jazz Aviation LP, making it an independent company. Air Canada Jazz was the brand name of Air Canada's main regional product from 2002 to 2011. As of June 2011, the Air Canada Jazz brand is no longer being marketed as all regional operators adopted the Air Canada Express name. Jazz Aviation is the largest of these affiliates, operating 125 aircraft on behalf of Air Canada.

Air Canada Tango

On 1 November 2001, Air Canada launched Air Canada Tango, designed to offer no-frills service and lower fares using a dedicated fleet of 13 Airbus A320s in an all economy configuration of 159 seats. In Canada, it operated from Toronto to Vancouver, Calgary, Edmonton, Winnipeg, Regina, Saskatoon, Thunder Bay, Ottawa, Montreal, Halifax, Gander and St. John's. In addition, it operated non-stop service between Toronto and Fort Lauderdale, Orlando and Tampa; as well as non-stop service between Montreal and Fort Lauderdale and Orlando. Tango was intended to compete with Canada 3000. The Tango service was dissolved in 2004. Air Canada now calls its lowest fare class "Tango". As of 2018, Air Canada has renamed the Tango fare class to Standard fare.

Zip

In 2002, Air Canada launched a discount airline to compete directly with WestJet on routes in Western Canada. Zip operated ex-Canadian Airlines International 737-200s as a separate airline with its own staff and brightly painted aircraft. It was disbanded in 2004.

Destinations

Air Canada flies to 64 domestic destinations and 158 international destinations across Asia, Africa, the Americas, Europe, and Oceania. Along with its regional partners, the carrier serves over 222 destinations in 47 countries, on six continents worldwide.

Air Canada currently flies two fifth freedom route, São Paulo-Buenos Aires and London Heathrow-Mumbai. Air Canada had flown a number of fifth freedom routes (passenger and cargo rights between two non-Canadian destinations). Past fifth freedom routes have included: Honolulu-Sydney, London Heathrow-Düsseldorf, Paris-Geneva, Paris-Munich, Paris-Berlin, Frankfurt-Zürich, Zürich-Zagreb, Zürich-Vienna, Zürich-Delhi, Manchester-Brussels, Lisbon-Madrid, Brussels-Prague, London Heathrow-Delhi, London Heathrow-Nice, London Heathrow-Mumbai-Singapore, Montego Bay-Kingston (KIN), and Santiago-Buenos Aires. However, these were replaced with nonstop routes: Vancouver-Sydney, Toronto-Munich, Toronto-Brussels, Toronto-Zürich, Vancouver-Zürich, Toronto-Vienna, Toronto-Delhi, Vancouver-Delhi, Toronto-Madrid, and Toronto-Mumbai.

Codeshare agreements
Air Canada codeshares with the following airlines:

 Aegean Airlines
 Aer Lingus
 Air China
 Air Dolomiti
 Air India
 Air New Zealand
 All Nippon Airways
 Asiana Airlines
 Austrian Airlines
 Avianca
 Brussels Airlines
 Cathay Pacific
 Central Mountain Air
 Croatia Airlines
 Egyptair
 Emirates
 Ethiopian Airlines
 Etihad Airways
 Eurowings
 EVA Air
 Gol Linhas Aéreas Inteligentes
 LOT Polish Airlines
 Lufthansa
 Middle East Airlines
 Qatar Airways
 Scandinavian Airlines
 Singapore Airlines
 SriLankan Airlines
 Swiss International Air Lines
 TAP Air Portugal
 Thai Airways International
 Turkish Airlines
 United Airlines
 Virgin Australia
 Vistara

Interline agreements 
Air Canada have Interline agreements with the following airlines:

 Aer Lingus
 Aegean Airlines
 Aerolíneas Argentinas
 Aeroméxico
 Air Algérie
 airBaltic
 Air Calédonie
 Air China
 Air Creebec
 Air Dolomiti
 Air France
 Air India
 Air Malta
 Air Mauritius
 Air New Zealand
 Air Serbia
 Air Tahiti Nui
 Alaska Airlines
 All Nippon Airways
 American Airlines
 Asiana Airlines
 Austrian Airlines
 Avianca
 Avianca Costa Rica
 Avianca Ecuador
 Avianca El Salvador
 Azul Brazilian Airlines
 Bearskin Airlines
 Biman Bangladesh Airlines
 British Airways
 Brussels Airlines
 Canadian North
 Caribbean Airlines
 Cathay Pacific
 Cayman Airways
 Central Mountain Air
 China Airlines
 China Eastern Airlines
 China Southern Airlines
 Copa Airlines
 Croatia Airlines
 Czech Airlines
 Delta Air Lines
 Edelweiss Air
 Egyptair
 Emirates
 Ethiopian Airlines
 Etihad Airways
 Eurowings
 EVA Air
 Fiji Airways
 First Air
 Garuda Indonesia
 Gol Linhas Aéreas Inteligentes
 Gulf Air
 Hawaiian Airlines
 Hong Kong Airlines
 Iberia
 Icelandair
 Japan Airlines
 Jeju Air
 Jetstar Airlines
 Jetstar Asia Airways
 Jetstar Japan
 Juneyao Airlines
 Kenya Airways
 KLM
 Korean Air
 Kuwait Airways
 LATAM Airlines Group
 LIAT
 LOT Polish Airlines
 Lufthansa
 Luxair
 Malaysia Airlines
 Olympic Air
 Oman Air
 Pakistan International Airlines
 Pascan Aviation
 Philippine Airlines
 PAL Airlines
 Qatar Airways
 Qantas
 Royal Air Maroc
 Royal Jordanian
 Saudia
 Scandinavian Airlines
 Shenzhen Airlines
 Silver Airways
 Singapore Airlines
 South African Airways
 SriLankan Airlines
 Swiss International Air Lines
 TAP Air Portugal
 Thai Airways International
 Tunisair
 Turkish Airlines
 Ukraine International Airlines
 United Airlines 
 Vietnam Airlines
 Virgin Atlantic
 Virgin Australia
 Widerøe

Fleet

As of January 2022, Air Canada operates a fleet of 168 aircraft, all Airbus and Boeing, along with 114 more turboprop and Regional Jets flying under the Air Canada Express brand.

Services
Air Canada has three classes of service, Business/Signature, Premium Economy, and Economy. On most long-haul international and short-haul routes operated by widebody aircraft, Signature Class, Premium Economy, and Economy Class are offered; most short-haul and domestic routes feature Business Class and Economy Class. All mainline seats feature AVOD (Audio Video On Demand) and mood lighting. Air Canada Express features Business Class and Economy Class, on CRJ-900 and Embraer E175 aircraft; all other Air Canada Express aircraft have one-class economy cabins. All narrowbody mainline aircraft, as well as Air Canada Express CRJ-900 and Embraer E175 aircraft have onboard Wi-Fi installed, which is also being installed on all widebody aircraft.

In the spring of 1987, Air Canada enacted no-smoking flights between Canada and New York City as a test. After a survey reported that 96% of passengers supported the smoking ban, Air Canada extended the ban to other flights.

Cabins

Signature Class

Signature Class (initially Executive First) cabins is Air Canada's international business class product. It is offered on all widebody aircraft. There are two different cabins available: the Executive Pod and the Classic Pod. All services feature AVOD (Audio Video On Demand) on a touch screen, noise cancelling headphones, and music provided by XM Satellite Radio.

Executive Pods are featured on all Boeing 777s, 787s and are being rolled out on the Airbus A330-300s. These seats feature electronic flat beds in a 1–2–1 reverse herringbone configuration with a  seat width and a  seat pitch. AVOD is provided with an  touch screen.

Classic Pods feature electronic flat beds, in a 1–1–1 herringbone configuration these are being currently phased out on the Airbus A330-300s. The Classic Pods have a  seat width and a  seat pitch in a reverse-herringbone configuration. AVOD is provided with a  touch screen.

Regional Business Class
Business Class (initially Executive Class) is offered on all narrowbody aircraft, as well as Air Canada Express CRJ-900 and E175 aircraft. On Airbus and Boeing narrow-body aircraft, seat configuration is 2–2 abreast, with 124° recline, and  width. All seats feature AVOD and music is provided by XM Satellite Radio. On Trans-Atlantic flights operated with the Boeing 737 MAX 8, this cabin is sold as Premium Economy.

Premium Economy

Premium Economy is offered on all Airbus A330, Boeing 777, and Boeing 787 aircraft. Entertainment is personal AVOD (Audio Video On Demand), while music is provided by XM Satellite Radio.

Air Canada Rouge operates flights on its aircraft with a premium economy class product, branded as Premium Rouge. This is sold as a business class product on Rouge flights within North America.

Economy Class

Configuration is 3–4–3 on the Boeing 777, 3–3–3 on the Boeing 787, 2–4–2 on the Airbus A330, 3–3 on the Boeing 737 MAX and the Airbus A320 family, 2–3 on the Airbus A220, and 2–2 on Bombardier, De Havilland, and Embraer aircraft. All Airbus, Boeing, and Embraer aircraft, as well as the CRJ900 are fitted with personal AVOD (audio-video on demand). Music is provided by XM Satellite Radio.

Complimentary meals are offered on all international flights outside of North America. For domestic, North American, sun destination and Caribbean flights, food and alcoholic beverages can be purchased through Air Canada Bistro (GuestLogix point of sale terminals are used) while non-alcoholic beverages are complimentary.

On all narrowbody aircraft and newly renovated A330s, there is an extra legroom Preferred Seat section in the first few rows and bulkhead and exit rows afterward of the economy cabin which provides up to  more seat pitch (approx. , aircraft dependent). All Air Canada Rouge planes offer Rouge Plus seats, which are identical to the Preferred Seats, but with up to  more seat pitch (35" on A319s and 36" on 767s) as well as an additional  of recline.

Air Canada Express
Air Canada Express flights operated by CRJ200 and Q400 aircraft offer a bar and refreshment service on board. The CRJ900 and E175 features Business Class and personal AVOD at every seat. Flights on board the E175, CRJ200/900 and Q400 which are 90 minutes or more feature Onboard Café.

Cabin crew
 
On 9 February 2017, a new uniform scheme coinciding with Canada's 150th and Air Canada's 80th anniversaries was unveiled. Air Canada partnered with Vancouver-born fashion designer Christopher Bates to design the new uniforms which incorporate a base colour of black or grey with red lettering and the famous maple leaf.

Between 2004 and 2017, Air Canada uniforms used a midnight blue colour. The uniforms were designed by Canadian fashion designer Debbie Shuchat. At a presentation in the Toronto Airport hangar, Celine Dion helped the newly solvent airline debut its new image.

Lounge

Air Canada has 23 Maple Leaf Lounges located at all major airports across Canada and at international locations including London-Heathrow, Paris-Charles de Gaulle, Frankfurt, Los Angeles, Newark and New York-LaGuardia. The Maple Leaf Lounges are available to passengers holding a same day ticket on Air Canada in Business Class, Star Alliance Gold Members, Air Canada Super Elite, Air Canada Elite, Air Canada Maple Leaf Club members, American Express Maple Leaf Club members, American Express AeroplanPlus Platinum holders, holders of a one time guest pass or economy passengers who have purchased lounge access during booking.

Air Canada shares an Arrivals Lounge at London Heathrow Terminal 2 with some other Star Alliance members. It is available to eligible passengers arriving into London from any Air Canada international flight, holding a confirmed same-day overseas travel boarding card. Eligible groups include Business Class Passengers, Air Canada Super Elite, Air Canada Elite, Air Canada Maple Leaf Club Members or American Express Maple Leaf Club.

Travellers who hold paid memberships to affiliated Star Alliance lounges, such as the United Club, are also eligible for access to Maple Leaf Lounges.

Frequent flyer program

Aeroplan is Air Canada's frequent flyer rewards program, both allowing for points collection and spending, as well as status and rewards as an Air Canada customer. After Air Canada and Aeroplan changed the division of points collection and redemption, Air Canada introduced an internal rewards program, Altitude. The two programs operate in conjunction.

On 11 May 2017, Air Canada announced it plans to launch a new loyalty program to replace Aeroplan and Altitude in 2020. On 10 January 2019, Air Canada re-acquired Aeroplan from Aimia. In 2020, Air Canada Altitude and Aeroplan merged, with Aeroplan as the surviving entity.

In Oct 2022, Air Canada announce some benefit changes for the 35K, 50K, and 75K member benefits. Starting from June 1st, 2023 the 35K members will no longer have free Maple Leaf Lounge access, instead, 35K members will have more improvement for their select benefit. The 50K and 75K and Super Elite members now will get a free Virgin Australia lounge.

Air Canada Altitude

On 20 September 2012, Air Canada unveiled its new frequent flyer status program named "Air Canada Altitude" to supplement Aeroplan. Aeroplan remained the frequent flyer rewards program, collecting miles which can be "spent", whereas status level is determined by Altitude standing.

There are five levels of membership in Air Canada's Altitude Program: Basic, Prestige 25K, Elite 35K, Elite 50K, Elite 75K and Super Elite 100K. The latter three are called "Top Tier" membership levels and provide travel benefits such as upgrades, lounge access, priority services (e.g., check-in, luggage handling), and bonuses when earning miles through air travel. In order to qualify for these levels, a member must earn, through flight activities, a certain number of miles or a certain number of segments and spending some level of money. Altitude refers to these as Altitude Qualifying Miles (AQM), Segments (AQS), and Dollars (AQD).

Prestige members and Altitude Elite 35 K receive Star Alliance Silver status, while Elite 50K, Elite 75K, and Super Elite 100K members receive Star Alliance Gold status.

Air Canada Status Miles are calculated on an annual basis to determine Altitude Membership Status for the following benefit year (1 March through 28 February). At the 35K and above levels, that level of status is granted when achieved, for the remainder of the current year, as well as for the next year.

This coincides with the alliance with Star Alliance, and this can give Star Alliance Gold passengers access to any Star Alliance lounge and discounts or upgrades on another Star Alliance member.

On 8 November 2020, Air Canada Altitude renamed as Aeroplan Elite Status. Altitude Qualifying Miles (AQM), Segments (AQS), and Dollars (AQD) have been replaced by Status Qualifying Miles (SQM), Segments (SQS), and Dollars (SQD).

Status requirements

Beginning 1 January 2016, for the 2017 status year, Air Canada began requiring a minimum spend level for each level, Altitude Qualifying Dollars. In 2021, the Altitude program has been replaced by the Aeroplan program. The requirements for 2021 are currently at:

 Aeroplan 25K: 25,000 SQM or 25 SQS and $3,000 SQD
 Aeroplan 35K: 35,000 SQM or 35 SQS and $4,000 SQD
 Aeroplan 50K: 50,000 SQM or 50 SQS and $6,000 SQD
 Aeroplan 75K: 75,000 SQM or 75 SQS and $9,000 SQD
 Aeroplan Super Elite: 100,000 SQM or 95 SQS and $20,000 SQD

Accidents and incidents

Privacy concerns
In February 2019, TechCrunch reported that the Air Canada mobile app in the iOS App Store incorporated session-replay software from the Israeli firm Glassbox. This software, without the users' informed consent, recorded users' activities and transmitted the data, including unredacted credit card data and passport numbers, to remote servers. This compromised users' privacy and contravened the rules of the iOS App Store.

See also

 ACE Aviation Holdings
 Air Canada Rouge
 Chorus Aviation
 Jazz Aviation LP
 List of airlines of Canada
 List of airports in Canada
 List of companies of Canada
 Air Transat
 Transportation in Canada
 Air transport in Canada

References

Further reading

External links 

 
 Air Canada Jazz
 CBC Digital Archives – Turbulent Skies: The Air Canada Story

 
1965 establishments in Quebec
Air Transport Association of Canada
Airlines established in 1965
Airlines for America associate members
Canadian brands
Canadian companies established in 1965
Companies based in Montreal
Companies listed on the Toronto Stock Exchange
Companies that have filed for bankruptcy in Canada
Former Crown corporations of Canada
Saint-Laurent, Quebec
Star Alliance